Heinave Kaifa is a Tongan professional football manager.

Career
Since 2002 until 2003 he was a head coach of the Tonga national football team.

References

External links
Profile at Manager K - Global Soccer Transfers

Year of birth missing (living people)
Living people
Tongan football managers
Tonga national football team managers
Place of birth missing (living people)